Louvergny is a former commune in the Ardennes department in northern France. On 1 January 2016, it was merged into the new commune Bairon et ses environs.

Geography
Louvergny is mostly situated on the southern bank of the Ruisseau des Prés, which flows into the Lake of Bairon.

Population

The inhabitants are called Marinettes.

See also
Communes of the Ardennes department

References

Former communes of Ardennes (department)
Ardennes communes articles needing translation from French Wikipedia
Populated places disestablished in 2016